This is a list of foreign players in Damallsvenskan, which commenced play in 1988. The following players must meet both of the following two criteria:
have played at least one Damallsvenskan game. Players who were signed by Damallsvenskan clubs, but only played in lower league, cup and/or European games, or did not play in any competitive games at all, are not included.
are considered foreign, determined by the following:
A player is considered foreign if she is not eligible to play for Sweden women's national football team.

The list is organized alphabetically first by country, then by player's name (surname and first name). Clubs listed are those which the player has played at least one Damallsvenskan game for.

List of players

Albania

Australia

Belgium

Bosnia and Herzegovina

Brazil

Cameroon

Canada

Chile

China

Chinese Taipei

Colombia

Croatia

Czech Republic

Denmark

England

Estonia

Finland

France

Germany

Greece

Iceland

Ireland

Italy

Ivory Coast

Japan

Macedonia

Malawi

Mexico

Netherlands

New Zealand

Nigeria

Northern Ireland

Norway

Philippines

Portugal

Russia

Scotland

Serbia

Slovakia

South Africa

Spain

Switzerland

Trinidad and Tobago

Turkey

Ukraine

United States

Wales

See also
List of Damallsvenskan players
List of foreign Allsvenskan players

Notes

References
As the Damallsvenskan is a competition organized by the Swedish Football Association (SvFF), the information provided by their website (Damallsvenskan at SvFF ) is a main reference source.

 
Sweden
 
Lists of association football players by club in Sweden
Association football player non-biographical articles